Tuscarawas Township is one of the seventeen townships of Stark County, Ohio, United States.  The 2000 census found 6,093 people in the township.

Geography
Located in the western part of the county, it borders the following townships:
Lawrence Township - north
Jackson Township - northeast corner
Perry Township - east
Bethlehem Township - southeast corner
Sugar Creek Township - south
Sugar Creek Township, Wayne County - west
Baughman Township, Wayne County - northwest

Part of the city of Massillon is located in eastern Tuscarawas Township.

Name and history

Statewide, the only other Tuscarawas Township is located in Coshocton County. In 1833, Tuscarawas Township consisted of 1 gristmill, 5 saw mills, 1 fulling mill, 2 tanneries, and 2 stores.

Government
The township is governed by a three-member board of trustees, who are elected in November of odd-numbered years to a four-year term beginning on the following January 1. Two are elected in the year after the presidential election and one is elected in the year before it. There is also an elected township fiscal officer, who serves a four-year term beginning on April 1 of the year after the election, which is held in November of the year before the presidential election. Vacancies in the fiscal officership or on the board of trustees are filled by the remaining trustees.

References

External links

Townships in Stark County, Ohio
Townships in Ohio